The 2005 Women's Pacific Handball Cup was held in Sydney, Australia between May 25 and 27, 2005.

The competition participants host Australia, New Zealand, Tahiti, and New Caledonia.

Hosts Australia were the winners and undefeated all tournament. The next three teams were separated by goal difference only with New Caledonia claiming second Tahiti third and New Zealand fourth.

Results

Rankings

References

External links
 Archive on Tudor 66
 Oceania Continent Handball Federation webpage

Pacific Handball Cup
Pacific Women's Handball Cup
Women's handball in Australia
2005 Pacific Women's Handball Cup
2005 in Australian sport